The 1960–61 NCAA men's basketball rankings was made up of two human polls, the AP Poll and the Coaches Poll.

Legend

AP Poll 
The December AP polls included 20 ranked teams, while AP polls for the remainder of the season included only 10 ranked teams.

UPI Poll

References 

1960-61 NCAA Division I men's basketball rankings
College men's basketball rankings in the United States